Psettichthyini is a type of fish in the Pleuronectinae subfamily. It consists of just one genus, Psettichthys.

Genera

 Psettichthys

Pleuronectidae
Fish tribes

fr:Psettichthyini